Mowery is a surname. Notable people with the surname include:

David C. Mowery, American economist
Edward J. Mowery (1906–1970), American journalist
Harold Mowery (1930–2014), American politician

See also
 Mowry (disambiguation)